Humanity Star was a reflective passive satellite designed to produce visible, pulsing flares. The satellite was launched into orbit by an Electron rocket on 21 January 2018 and entered into the atmosphere on 22 March 2018. The reaction to Humanity Star was mostly negative by astronomers, as it interferes with their observations.

Design 
Humanity Star was designed to produce flares visible from Earth. It is made out of carbon fiber and weigh . According to Rocket Lab, Humanity Star was meant to be "a bright symbol and reminder to all on Earth about our fragile place in the universe".

Launch and orbit
Humanity Star was launched on 21 January 2018 at 01:43 UTC from Rocket Lab Launch Complex 1, located on the Māhia Peninsula of New Zealand. According to Rocket Lab, the satellite's orbit was expected to decay after nine months, eventually burning up completely in Earth's atmosphere. However, the satellite re-entered several months early on 22 March 2018 at about 13:15 UTC. The quick entry could be caused by the Humanity Star's low density, amplifying atmospheric drag effects.

Because of its highly reflective surface, Rocket Lab claimed that Humanity Star could be seen by the naked eye from the surface of the Earth. The satellite was most likely to be visible in the night sky at dawn or dusk. Its orbit could be tracked by Heavens-Above and the satellite's website.

Analysis
Initial reactions by astronomers were negative, since reflective objects in orbit interferes with astronomical observations. It has been described as an act of vandalism of the night sky, space graffiti, a "publicity stunt" and "glittery space garbage". Others however argue that flares by existing satellites and the ISS are much brighter than Humanity Star.

Alice Gorman postulates that Humanity Star and Elon Musk's Tesla Roadster are statements with very different but related messages: while Humanity Star may be seen as promoting a unifying vision and the Roadster as a reminder of inequality, "each tells the story of  attitudes to space at a particular point in time."

See also
 KiwiSAT
 Light pollution
 Lincoln Calibration Sphere 1
 Project Echo

References

External links
 

2018 in New Zealand
2018 controversies
Passive satellites
Spacecraft launched in 2018
Spacecraft which reentered in 2018
Satellites of New Zealand
Spacecraft launched by Electron rockets